FC Agtala Moscow was a Russian football team from Moscow. It played professionally in 1992 in the Russian Second Division, but was excluded after playing 13 games.

External links
  Team history at KLISF

Association football clubs established in 1992
Association football clubs disestablished in 1992
Defunct football clubs in Moscow
1992 establishments in Russia
1992 disestablishments in Russia